Live action is term in cinematography.

Live Action  may refer to:

 Live! Action, a live album by jazz saxophonist Willis Jackson recorded in 1964
 Live Action (album), a 1992 album by Dive
 Live Action (organization), American anti-abortion activist organization
 "Live Action", an alternative title for "Last Last One Forever and Ever", an episode of Aqua Teen Hunger Force

See also
 Live Action Set, American performance company
 Live Action at ROCK ALL, Oslo, 1994